Kevin Sanders may refer to:

Kevin Sanders (motorcyclist), British world record holder for circumnavigation
Kevin Sanders (musician), member of the Georgia band Cartel
Kevin Sanders (television), Australian television personality